Augustin Hilti (13 October 1896 – 16 July 1955) was a Liechtenstein sports shooter. He competed in the 50 m rifle event at the 1936 Summer Olympics.

References

External links
 

1896 births
1955 deaths
Liechtenstein male sport shooters
Olympic shooters of Liechtenstein
Shooters at the 1936 Summer Olympics